Lyndon B. Johnson Hospital may refer to:
 Lyndon B. Johnson Tropical Medical Center in American Samoa
 Lyndon B. Johnson General Hospital of the Harris Health System in northeast Houston, Texas